Kids See Ghosts was an American hip hop duo composed of musicians Kanye West and Kid Cudi. 

 Kids See Ghosts (album), their eponymous 2018 album
 "Kids See Ghosts" (song), featuring Yasiin Bey, 2018